Ranjan Ghosh ( Rônjôn Ghosh) is a Bengali filmmaker based out of Kolkata, India. He had risen to prominence with the release of Aparna Sen's Bengali feature film Iti Mrinalini, by becoming the first and the only screenwriter, the acclaimed actor-director had collaborated with in her illustrious career till date. With this film, Ghosh had made his screenwriting debut; the film had also marked the acclaimed director's return to Bengali cinema after more than a decade.
He made his directorial debut in 2014 with the critically acclaimed Hrid Majharey, a Bengali feature film starring Abir Chatterjee and Raima Sen. Inspired by certain iconic plays of William Shakespeare, it was the first film in the Bengali language based on the works of the Bard and was presented as a tribute on his 450th Birth Anniversary. His second film Rongberonger Korhi was an anthology of four short films woven around the theme of money and its relationship with human beings. It featured National Award-winning actor Rituparna Sengupta, veteran cine star Chiranjeet Chakraborty, critically acclaimed actors Ritwick Chakraborty, Soham Chakraborty, Kharaj Mukherjee, Arunima Ghosh, Arjun Chakrabarty and others. It became a widely acclaimed film on release in 2018, before doing the festival rounds in Dubai, Dhaka, London, and nationally at Delhi, Mumbai, Bengaluru, Pune and Hyderabad. In 2019, Ghosh released his third feature film, the hugely successful Ahaa Re featuring Bangladeshi actor Arifin Shuvoo, Rituparna Sengupta, Amrita Chattopadhyay, Paran Bandopadhyay, Deepankar De, Shakuntala Barua, Bangladeshi Cinema film actor Alamgir in a special appearance as a restaurant owner. The film made it to a coveted list of 25 all-time great Asian films about food, compiled by international film web magazine Asian Movie Pulse. Ghosh's fourth feature film Mahishasur Marddini featuring his muse Rituparna Sengupta along with Saswata Chatterjee, Parambrata Chattopadhyay and a bunch of young theatre actors, released in 2022 and is touted as his boldest work till date in which he experiments with form and style, combining the elements of theatre and cinema. The film was screened at the Jawaharlal Nehru University and Jamia Millia Islamia University. Earlier it became the first Indian feature film to screen at any theatre festival when it played at the 21st Habitat Theatre Festival, 2022, organized by the India Habitat Centre, New Delhi.

Early life
Brought up in a Bengali family in a satellite township in West Bengal, Ranjan Ghosh studied at St. Xavier's School, Durgapur and at BC Institution. Thereafter, he moved to Calcutta to take up Physics at Jadavpur University. Very soon he left his higher studies to become a mariner, and embarked on a career that would take him almost all around the world for the next four years. He holds a Degree in Nautical Sciences from The University of Mumbai. In 2007, Ranjan bid adieu to his sea-life and joined Mumbai based film school Whistling Woods International to study filmmaking. He graduated in 2009 with a major in screenwriting.

Career

2009 – 2014

While still in his film school, Ranjan worked as a script assistant on the National Film Award winning 2009 Bengali film Antaheen. He later assisted the director Aniruddha Roy Chowdhury on the shoot of the same film.

After graduating in 2009, Ghosh made his screenwriting debut co-authoring the story and screenplay of Iti Mrinalini, a 2011 Bengali film directed by Aparna Sen. The screenplay was a professional assignment in the film school course syllabus. It was the first instance in Indian Screenwriting that any screenplay emerging from any Indian film institute was actually filmed. With this, Ranjan Ghosh went on to become Aparna Sen's first and only co-author till date. Considered a high-profile project, Iti Mrinalini – Aparna Sen's return to Bengali Cinema after a decade – also starred the director-actor along with her daughter Konkona Sen Sharma in the title role. Apart from co-writing the film, Ghosh assisted Aparna Sen in direction and on the production design. Reportedly, the entire memorabilia of the actress Mrinalini in the film was designed and created by him, with some help from the art department.

Post Iti Mrinalini, Ghosh had collaborated with Prakash Jha, who was supposed to make his debut as a producer for Bengali films. The film was a loose adaptation of Jha's National Film Award winning 2003 Hindi film Gangaajal. The adapted story and screenplay, penned by Ghosh, was a comment on contemporary Bengal politics with the 1980 Bhagalpur blindings as the backdrop. It did not eventually take off.

Ranjan Ghosh made his directorial debut with the critically acclaimed Abir Chatterjee-Raima Sen starrer Hrid Majharey in July, 2014. It had created history by becoming the first Bengali film to be shot in the Andaman & Nicobar Islands after a gap of almost 33 years. It was shot in 2013 in the Archipelagos. The last time was in 1979 when veteran filmmaker Tapan Sinha partly shot his Children's adventure film Sabuj Dwiper Raja in Port Blair. In 2014, it had earned a rare recommendation from Film London in its list of world cinema based on Shakespearean plays. In another major achievement, the film and its screenplay went on to be included in the UGC Literature Archive through the Shakespeare in Bengal project conducted by Jadavpur University.

In 2015, the film was screened at the New York University Tisch School of the Arts in 2015, and was included in their PhD in Cinema Studies (Shakespeare and Indian Cinema). Also that year, the Oxford, Cambridge and RSA Examinations Board enlisted Hrid Majharey in 'Additional References – World/International Adaptations of Othello' for their 'A Level Drama and Theatre' course with the theme 'Heroes and Villains – Othello'. Prominent international movies in the exclusive list of nine were A Double Life (USA, 1947), All Night Long (UK, 1962), Catch My Soul (USA, 1974), O (USA, 2001), Omkara (India, 2006), among others.

In April 2016, the film was the focus in the 'Bengali Shakespeares' Chapter at an international conference titled 'Indian Shakespeares on Screen' jointly held by the British Film Institute and The University of London in April 2016 in London to mark 400 years of the Bard's demise.

In June 2021, Hrid Majharey became a part of the European Shakespeare Conference, organized by the European Shakespeare Research Association and the National and Kapodistrian University of Athens, Greece. And, in July, it had a special screening at the 11th World Shakespeare Congress, held by the International Shakespeare Association and the National University of Singapore.

2015 – 2019

In 2016, Ghosh began the shoot of his second feature-length film Rongberonger Korhi. The first draft of the screenplay was written in 2015 and underwent rewrites till it went into production in September 2016. Initially, these were written as short film projects for the Satyajit Ray Film and Television Institute (SRFTI). Ghosh roped in his mentor Aparna Sen as the Creative Consultant on the film that was an anthology of four shorts.reenplay that she was really impressed with.

In 2017, Rongberonger Korhi was selected as a Market Recommended Film at the Dubai Film Market of the 14th edition of the Dubai International Film Festival, that being the only Bengali Film of 2017 to make the cut. The festival was held from 6–13 December 2017, at Dubai, UAE.

In 2018, the film was further screened at the 13th Habitat Film Festival organized by the India Habitat Centre held from 19–27 May 2018, in New Delhi, India. It won the Best Film (Critics), Best Director (Critics), Best Actor Female (Critics), Best Supporting Actor Male (Popular) and Jury Special Mention at the Telangana Bengali Film Festival held in Hyderabad. It screened in the Indian Vista section of the 17th Third Eye Asian Film Festival, Mumbai, 2018, and reportedly got an overwhelming response from a full house and a 3* critics' rating. Next, the film was screened at the 9th Asian Film Festival, Pune, held at the National Film Archive of India there from 24–30 December 2018.

In 2019, Rongberonger Korhi was screened in the Cinema of the World section of the 17th Dhaka International Film Festival held between 10–18 January 2019, in Dhaka. The screenings were at the National Library of Bangladesh auditorium and at the Shilpakala Academy of Bangladesh. It was also selected in the 'Chitrabharati (Indian Cinema) Competition' section of the 11th Bengaluru International Film Festival, 2019, organized by the Karnataka Chalanachitra Academy and supported by the Government of Karnataka.

2019 also saw the release of one of the year's most acclaimed films, Ahaa Re, starring Ghosh's muse Rituparna Sengupta and the Bangladeshi star Arifin Shuvoo in the lead. The film also had veterans Paran Bandopadhyay, Dipankar De, and Shakuntala Barua, as also young actors Amrita Chattopadhyay and Anuvab Pal. Ahaa Re was a cross-border love story about two chefs, and went on to become one of the most talked about films of the year. Apart from featuring in almost all lists of the 'Top 10 films' of that year, it went on to be included in an envious list of '25 Great Asian Films about Food' drawn up by international film magazine Asian Movie Pulse. The film had won a Jury Special Mention at the Rainbow Film Festival in London; the Audience Choice Award at the Indian Film Festival in Boston. Ghosh was conferred the Best Director award for this film by the Satyajit Ray Film Society, Bengaluru; Rituparna Sengupta won a nomination for Best Actress at the Indian Film Festival of Melbourne for her supreme act. The film had travelled to international and Indian festivals across the world – London, Kunming, Singapore, Melbourne, New York, Dallas, Boston, Cincinnati, Dhaka, and back home in Delhi, Mumbai, Pune, Bengaluru, Hyderabad, and Guwahati among others. It ranks among the most powerful characters essayed by Rituparna Sengupta in her illustrious career spanning three decades.

2020–present

In April 2020, Ghosh planned to shoot his fourth feature film titled Mahishasur Marddini. In an interview to The Times of India in December 2019, he had shared that he was planning a dark film as his next. Owing to the Covid-19 pandemic, the shoot was cancelled. The camera finally rolled in 2021 February, and the shoot was completed in August 2021 after two grueling schedules braving the second Covid wave.

Filmography
 Antaheen (2009) (scripting assistant)
 Iti Mrinalini (2011) (screenwriter and director's assistant)
 Hrid Majharey (2014) (screenwriter and director)
 Rongberonger Korhi (2018) (screenwriter, production designer, director)
 Ahaa Re (2019) (screenwriter, production designer, director)
 Mahishasur Marddini (2022) (screenwriter, production designer, director)

References

External links

Indian male screenwriters
Film directors from Kolkata
Bengali film directors
Bengali screenwriters
21st-century Indian film directors
Bengali Hindus
Screenwriters from Kolkata
Jadavpur University alumni
University of Mumbai alumni